The Vogues are an American vocal rock and roll group from Turtle Creek, Pennsylvania, a suburb of Pittsburgh. The original lineup consisted of Bill Burkette (lead baritone), Don Miller (baritone), Hugh Geyer (first tenor), and Chuck Blasko (second tenor).

They are best known for their chart-topping singles "You're the One", "Five O'Clock World", "Magic Town", and "Turn Around, Look at Me". In addition to touring the world, the group appeared on American Bandstand, The Tonight Show, and The Ed Sullivan Show. They were inducted into the Vocal Group Hall of Fame in 2001.

Career

The group, originally named the Val-Aires, formed in 1958 at Turtle Creek High School. They signed with Pittsburgh manager Elmer Willet, who produced their first recording release "Which One Will It Be/Launie My Love". DJ Porky Chedwick became a supporter booking the group for his rock and roll shows and record hops. Chedwick put them on bills with the Drifters, the Platters, and the Dells. Clark Race of KDKA radio promoted the group on his KDKA-TV dance show. Having strong regional sales, the single was picked up for national distribution by Coral Records.

After high school, members of the group variously joined the Army or went to college. After their enlistments and college degrees were completed, they decided to record again. Each member paid $100 towards the fee to record a demo tape. They hired Nick Cenci, who had helped bring Lou Christie mainstream success, to produce the recording. In 1965, Cenci produced recording sessions for the Val-Aires at Gateway Studios in Pittsburgh, including vocals for a cover of the Petula Clark song "You're the One", which was released on the band's own Blue Star label. Cenci then persuaded John Rook, program director of KQV, to play the single. With local airplay and sales Cenci signed them to the Co & Ce label as the "Vogues" and secured national distribution. The song soon became a national hit reaching number four on the Billboard Hot 100. Later in 1965, Cenci produced another Vogues recording session, which resulted in the No. 4 Billboard hit, "Five O'Clock World".

In 1966, Co & Ce Records released the singles "Magic Town", which reached no. 21 in February of that year, and the no. 29 "The Land of Milk and Honey". The singles "Summer Afternoon" and "Lovers of the World Unite" were released on Co & Ce in 1967. Co & Ce leased the Vogues to Reprise Records (distributed by Warner Bros.) where they found success with cover versions of "Turn Around, Look at Me" (No. 7), "My Special Angel" (No. 7), "Till" (No. 27), "No, Not Much" (No. 34), "Earth Angel (Will You Be Mine)" (No. 42), "Moments to Remember" (No. 47), and "Green Fields" (No. 92). Dick Glasser also produced several unreleased singles by The Vogues for Reprise, including Paul Levinson's "Unbelievable (Inconceivable) You". The original group appeared on popular TV shows in the 1960s, including The Tonight Show, The Ed Sullivan Show, Shindig, The Red Skelton Show, The Glen Campbell Goodtime Hour, American Bandstand, Hullabaloo, and The Mike Douglas Show.

In 1971, the Vogues signed a recording contract with Bell Records and recorded three singles ("Love Song", "Take Time to Tell Her", and "American Family").  In 1972, the group released one single on Mainstream Records ("Need You" b/w "Greatest Show on Earth").  By 1973, Geyer had left the group. Now recording for 20th Century Records, the group released three singles ("My Prayer", "Wonderful Summer", and "Prisoner of Love"), which were commercially unsuccessful and represented the last singles released by The Vogues.

Miller left the group in 1974 and was replaced by a succession of other vocalists. By the 1980s, the group had stopped touring and were concentrating on Western Pennsylvania venues. Burkette left the group in 1983, leaving Chuck Blasko as the only original member of The Vogues. Vocalist Gary Racan joined Chuck Blasko & The Vogues and performed with them for 16 years, departing to start his own band.

At some point during the late 1970s or early 1980s, the group's manager trademarked the name and assets of the Vogues. He later sold the trademark to Bengar Inc (Pete Garofalo), who starting booking other quartets as the Vogues. Pete Garofalo was a baritone who was with The Vogues from 1973 through the early 1990s. While owner of the trademark, he performed with them as well as having a group touring on the road. Pete Garofalo died in 1997, which led to the sale of the trademark. The trademark was sold several times, resulting in a variety of unrelated groups of singers claiming to be the Vogues. In 2000, the trademark was purchased by vocalist and Pittsburgh area native Stan Elich. During these years Blasko continued to perform as the Vogues, clashed with the "trademark" group, and eventually testified in front of Congress on the Truth in Music Act. A lawsuit filed by Blasko ended with the Pennsylvania court permitting Blasko's Vogues to perform in 14 Western Pennsylvania counties and the "trademark" group to perform everywhere else in the world as The Vogues.

From 2004 until 2006, Geyer joined Blasko's Vogues in the 14 Western Pennsylvania counties that Blasko's group was permitted to tour in. After creative differences with Blasko, Geyer again left group at the end of 2006. In March 2007, Geyer joined the nationally touring "trademark" group of The Vogues of trademark owner Elich. Geyer continued to perform with this group until his retirement in December 2012. In May 2008, original lead vocalist Bill Burkette also joined Geyer in touring the US with the "trademark" Vogues. The members of this group included Burkette, Geyer, Elich, Elich's son Troy, and Jim Campagna. Elich died in December 2010. Troy Elich now owns the trademark "The Vogues".

In 2010, The Elich-owned Vogues released a live album, The Vogues Sings the Hits Live, on the Desert Trax Music label. This marked the first time in 38 years that Burkette and Geyer recorded together.

The Vogues' line-up in April 2022 was Troy Elich, Royce Taylor, and Bo Wagner. Taylor had previously been a member of The "trademark" Vogues from 1991 to 1997. Wagner is a former member of Blasko's Pittsburgh Vogues group.

The original group was inducted into the Vocal Group Hall of Fame in 2001.

Bill Burkette (born William W. Burkette III on September 17, 1942) died of lymphoma on March 1, 2018, at the age of 75.

Don Miller died on January 11, 2021, reportedly of COVID-19, at age 80.

Studio albums
 Meet the Vogues (1965)
 Five O'Clock World (1966)
 Turn Around, Look at Me (1968) (No. 29 Billboard 200)
 Till (1969) (No.  30 Billboard 200)
 Memories (1969)
 The Vogues' Greatest Hits (1970)
 The Vogues Sing the Good Old Songs (1970)

Singles

References

External links
 'The Vogues' Vocal Group Hall of Fame Page
 The Vogues homepage (the trademark group featuring Bill Burkette)

American vocal groups
American pop music groups
Musical groups from Pittsburgh
People from Turtle Creek, Pennsylvania
1963 establishments in Pennsylvania
Reprise Records artists
Traditional pop music singers
Musical groups established in 1963